Joachimsthal Kaiserbahnhof is a railway station in the municipality of Joachimsthal, located in the Barnim district in Brandenburg, Germany.

References

Railway stations in Brandenburg
Buildings and structures in Barnim
Railway stations in Germany opened in 1898